Geophis nigrocinctus, also known as the black-banded earth snake, is a snake of the colubrid family. It is found in Mexico.

References

Geophis
Snakes of North America
Endemic reptiles of Mexico
Reptiles described in 1959
Taxa named by William Edward Duellman